The Max M. Fisher College of Business is the business school of The Ohio State University, a public research university in Columbus, Ohio. Fisher's campus is located on the northern part of the university within a partially enclosed business campus adjacent to St. John Arena. It is composed of brick buildings loosely arranged in a quadrangle. The  complex is the largest multi-building project ever undertaken by the university. Fisher is one of the founding members of the AACSB.

Established in 1916 as the College of Commerce and Journalism, the college was renamed in 1993 for Max M. Fisher, a 1930 Ohio State graduate who led efforts to provide a $20 million gift to the college. By design, it enrolls about 120 full-time Master of Business Administration (MBA) students each year. It also enrolls nearly 8,000 full-time undergraduate students and has nearly 83,000 living alumni.

Location & environment
The Max M. Fisher College of Business is located in Columbus, Ohio, the largest city in Ohio and the 14th largest city in the United States with an estimated 2018 population of 892,553.  The greater Columbus metropolitan area has a population of 2,041,520 as of 2016 and represents close to 100 nationalities. Columbus is located close to the geographic center of the state and is the second largest city in the Midwest.

Academics

Fisher's MBA curriculum allows students to customize their focus. After learning the core functions of business, students can select from elective courses to refine their knowledge. Another element of the curriculum is the Professional Leadership & Development program consisting of seminars, workshops, and training sessions that differentiate Fisher MBAs in the work force. Students have opportunities to participate in interview training and networking workshops, join leading business executives and alumni in exclusive luncheon series, or learn about many career choices.

International study and work opportunities are offered around the world to complement the MBA program—including study abroad, global applied projects, internship opportunities, and job placement.

Faculty
Fisher has a student–faculty ratio of 3:1.

Degrees offered
Bachelor of Science in Business Administration (BSBA)
Full-time MBA (FTMBA)
MBA for Working Professionals (WPMBA)
Executive MBA (EMBA)
Master of Business Logistics Engineering (MBLE)
Master of Accounting (MAcc)
Master of Human Resource Management (MHRM)
Specialized Master - Finance (SMF)
Master of Business Operational Excellence (MBOE)
PhD in Business Administration; Accounting & MIS; Human Resource Management
Specialized Master in Business Analytics (SMB-A)

Admissions
Full-Time MBA Students at Fisher generally have 4–6 years of work experience, are academically strong, and score high on the Graduate Management Admission Test (GMAT). The average GMAT is around 667 with 80% of the class scoring between 640 and 720. The median age of the recently admitted applicants is 27 years old. Approximately one third are from overseas, one in three are women, and one in seven is an underrepresented domestic minority. The Working Professionals class profile closely resembles the full-time profile with students having on average two additional years of professional experience.

Campus plan and architecture

The six-building campus (designed by Kallmann, McKinnell & Wood, Cooper, Robertson & Partners with Karlsberger Architecture as Architect of Record) is oriented around its largest building, the signature Fisher Hall, which is the same height as the main university library and on axis with it. This visually links the college to the larger OSU campus. The organization of undergraduate buildings, graduate study, and administration cluster around a traditional campus green that encourages social mixing of different student bodies and faculty. The brick architecture reinterprets the Neo-Classical tradition found throughout OSU. Cooper, Robertson & Partners designed both Fisher Hall and Pfahl Hall, the executive education building. Kallmann, McKinnell & Wood designed Gerlach Hall, Schoenbaum Hall and Mason Hall. RTKL was hired as the hospitality consultant for the Blackwell Inn. Karlsberger completed all design documents and served as construction administrator for the entire complex.

The campus consists of the following buildings and offices:

 Fisher Hall
 Faculty offices
 Administrative offices
 Research and business partnership centers
 Gerlach Hall
 Graduate business programs
 Batten investment laboratory
 Office of career management
 Mason Hall
 Student computer labs
 Office of Information Technology Services
 Rohr Cafe
 Pfahl Hall
 Executive education programs
 Conference center
 2110 Restaurant
 Schoenbaum Hall
 Undergraduate business programs
 Berry auditorium
 The Blackwell Inn and Conference Center
 151 Hotel rooms
 Conference rooms
 Banquet facilities

Student organizations & activities
Fisher's undergraduate and graduate-level students have the opportunity to get involved in a variety of student-run organizations. In addition to the hundreds of student clubs available through the University, Fisher also sponsors the Finance Club, Real Estate Club, the International Club, the Club for Women in Business, the Marketing Organization, the Partner's Club, or more specialized clubs such as the Golf Club. Fisher Serves is an organization that engages in community service activities such as charity fund raising activities and uses its members skills to offer pro-bono consulting to local businesses or serve on the board of non-profit organizations. The Fisher Citizenship Program provides an outlet for first-year and transfer student engagement in the college. Buckeye Capital Investors is an investment club focused on educating members on the financial markets and how to actively invest and manage a portfolio.

The American Accounting Association's Hall of Fame was established at Fisher in 1950 to honor those who in some way distinguished themselves in the field. An international board of accountants nominate and select new members annually to add to the 78 inducted members. Current Ohio State University faculty are prohibited from nomination.

Affiliations
Fisher College of Business has exchange programs and MoUs with other universities, including Atatürk University in Erzerüm, Turkey, Indian Institute of Management Ahmedabad, India.

Gallery

See also
 List of Big Ten business schools
List of United States business school rankings
List of business schools in the United States

References

External links
 Official website

Business schools in Ohio
Colleges, schools, and departments of Ohio State University
Educational institutions established in 1916
University District (Columbus, Ohio)
New Classical architecture
1916 establishments in Ohio